Dundry Main Road South Quarry is a 0.7 hectare geological Site of Special Scientific Interest near the village of East Dundry, North Somerset, notified in 1974.

The quarry was cited in the 19th century by d'Orbigny as the English "type section" for the Inferior Oolite. Dundry has long been a famous palaeontological and stratigraphic locality. The type locality for many species of molluscs and brachiopods, as well as other lesser groups, it is renowned as one of the world's most fossiliferous exposures with well over two hundred species recorded. The Main Road Quarry exposes a fine section in the Middle and Upper Inferior Oolite, with the rocks lying stratigraphically below them visible at Barns Batch Spinney. The former characterised by a typically southern English-Normandy fauna, including the rich ammonite occurrences of the "Brown iron-shot", and the latter by contrasting faunas of Cotswold aspect. This contrast is direct evidence for movements of the Mendip Axis in Middle Jurassic times, making this an outstanding site for its bearing on studies of palaeogeography.

References 

Bath and North East Somerset
Quarries in Somerset
Sites of Special Scientific Interest in Avon
Sites of Special Scientific Interest notified in 1974